Mrs. Findley Braden was the pen name of Anna Braden (Rile; January 11, 1858 – 1939) an American author, newspaper editor, and elocutionist. Prior to marriage, she used Madge Rile and other pen names.

Early life and education
Anna Margaretta (nickname, "Madge") Rile was born in Montgomery, Pennsylvania, January 11, 1858. Her parents were John Conver and Sarah (Frantz) Rile. She was of English and German descent, and her ancestors lived in or near Philadelphia, Pennsylvania, for over a century and a half. Her father was John Conver Rile. Her mother's maiden name was Frantz. She is fifth in direct line of descent from Joseph Reed, a Founding Father of the United States, his daughter being her great-grandmother.

She graduated from the National School of Elocution and Oratory, Philadelphia.

Career
At the age of 15, Braden began writing for the newspapers and magazines. Beginning in 1874, she wrote under her maiden name, "Madge Rile", and several pen names.

Since her marriage, she adopted her husband's name, signing her articles "Mrs. Findley Braden". She wrote over 700 humorous and pathetic sketches, poems and serials, many of which appeared in the secular journals of New York City, Boston, and Philadelphia. She also wrote a number of songs that found their way into public favor. She was equally at home in the five dialects, Scotch, Irish, Negro, Dutch, and Quaker. She published several volumes of poems.

Braden served as the editor of the monthly newspaper, Presbyterian Visitor, established in 1888, and published by Graves & Banks, Philadelphia.

Personal life
In 1880, she married William Findley Braden (1852–1933), of Ohio, and they resided in Philadelphia. There were no children.

Braden was a member of the Presbyterian Church.

Anna Rile Braden died in 1939.

Selected works

Books

 Something new to recite (1908) (Text)

Poems
 "Heart-Murder" (1894)
 "Pills at Poughkeepsie" (1894)
 "She's In the Smart Set Now"
 "He Fought with Washington"
 "You Hae But Ae Mither To Lose" (1905)
 "Thae Auld Laird's Secret" (1918)
 "What the Lord Had Done For Him" (1918)
 "Fence o' Scripture Faith" (1918)

Musical compositions
 "Dreaming of Sweetheart Prue", words by Mrs. Findley Braden, music by W. A. Webb (1912)

Plays
 Convention of Realistic Readers (1918)

Recitations
 "The Fence O' Scripture Faith" (1887)
 "Rejoicin' at De Co'ners" (Negro dialect) (1894)
 "Con Cannon's Christmas Gift" (Irish dialect) (1899)
 "Mickey's Proposal" (Irish dialect) (1899)
 "A Bridal Soliloguy" (1899)
 "The Skeleton Soldier" (1899)

References

External links
 
 

1858 births
1939 deaths
19th-century American writers
20th-century American writers
19th-century American women writers
20th-century American women writers
Elocutionists
Writers from Pennsylvania
19th-century pseudonymous writers
20th-century pseudonymous writers
Pseudonymous women writers
People from Lycoming County, Pennsylvania
19th-century American newspaper editors
Women newspaper editors
Wikipedia articles incorporating text from A Woman of the Century